The first automotive torpedo was developed in 1866, and the torpedo boat was developed soon after. In 1898, while the Spanish–American War was being fought in the Caribbean and the Pacific, Assistant Secretary of the Navy Theodore Roosevelt wrote that the Spanish torpedo boat destroyers were the only threat to the American navy, and pushed for the acquisition of similar vessels. On 4 May 1898, the US Congress authorized the first sixteen torpedo boat destroyers and twelve seagoing torpedo boats for the United States Navy.

The peacetime years between 1919 and 1941 resulted in many of these flush deck destroyers being laid up. Additionally, treaties regulated destroyer construction. The 1500-ton destroyers built in the 1930s under the treaties had stability problems that limited expansion of their armament in World War II. During World War II, the United States began building larger 2100-ton destroyers with five-gun main batteries, but without stability problems.

The first major warship produced by the U.S. Navy after World War II (and in the Cold War) were "frigates"—the ships were originally designated destroyer leaders but reclassified in 1975 as guided missile cruisers (except the  became guided missile destroyers). These grew out of the last all-gun destroyers of the 1950s. In the middle 1970s the s entered service, optimized for anti-submarine warfare. A special class of guided missile destroyers was produced for the Shah of Iran, but due to the Iranian Revolution these ships could not be delivered and were added to the U.S. Navy.

The , introduced in 1991, has been the U.S. Navy's only destroyer class in commission since 2005; construction continued through 2012 and was restarted in 2015. The Zumwalt class will number three ships.

Pre–World War I 

In 1864, US Navy Lt. William B. Cushing sank the ironclad  using a "spar torpedo"—an explosive device mounted on a long pole and detonated underwater. The threat a small, fast, torpedo–delivering ship could pose to the battle line became clear to navies around the world; giving birth to the torpedo boat, including  of the United States Navy.

During the Spanish–American War, Assistant Secretary of the Navy Theodore Roosevelt wrote Spanish torpedo boat destroyers (such as the 370-ton ) were "the only real menace" to the fleet blockading Santiago, and pushed for the acquisition of torpedo boats and torpedo boat destroyers. As President, Theodore Roosevelt continued to pay close attention to naval affairs, including the expansion of the Navy's fleet of destroyers.

In 1898 Congress authorized 16 torpedo boat destroyers, which would join the fleet by 1903. The subsequent  and  classes displaced , the reason these classes were nicknamed "flivvers" (lightweights, after the Model T Ford). By the time the United States entered World War I, destroyers displaced  and burned oil instead of coal. These "1000 tonners" were armed with eight to twelve torpedo tubes, four /50 caliber guns; and had a complement of approximately 100 officers and men. The 1000 tonners were the  through  classes, and were also called "broken deckers", due to their high forecastles.

World War I 

Prior to entering World War I in 1917, the United States began producing destroyers to a new design with a continuous sheer strake, collectively referred to as "flush deckers". The others of this and the 267 ships of the mass-production  and  classes that followed all had two screws. As built, they also had four stacks, which gave rise to the nicknames "four stackers" or "four pipers".
Eleven shipyards participated in their construction, which peaked in 1917 and 1918. By the time of the Armistice of 11 November 1918, keels for 177 ships had been laid and 41 had joined the fleet. Though the remaining ships were not needed in peacetime, the building program continued and by the end of May 1921, all but four of the 273 flush-deckers had been placed in commission. The final two did not follow until August 1922.

While the flush-deckers' freeboard fore and aft were designed to match preceding classes, the new ships differed in other respects. The waist guns were moved to a platform amidships, the galley beneath them; and a bulwark added between the galley and the bridge.

A typical flush deck destroyer had a normal crew of 105 officers and men, and was armed with four 4-inch deck guns, one 3-inch anti-aircraft gun, 12  torpedo tubes, two stern-mounted depth charge racks, along with .50-caliber machine guns and small arms. Destroyers quickly acquired the anti-submarine warfare mission against U-boats in the Atlantic and Mediterranean, being equipped with depth charge racks, hydrophones, and eventually Y-gun depth charge throwers. However, it was very difficult to successfully attack a U-boat with World War I technology, and US anti-submarine forces only scored two kills in that war.

Between the World Wars 

After the end of World War I, there was little need for the destroyers built, so many were laid up, and fourteen had their torpedo tubes removed and were converted to minesweepers. On 8 September 1923, seven of the ships ran aground off the coast of California in the U.S. Navy's worst ever peacetime disaster.

In 1922, the Washington Naval Treaty was signed by the United States, the British Empire, the Empire of Japan, France, and Italy. The treaty called for a freeze in the size and composition of the world's major navies, including the U.S. Navy, which ceased production of large capital ships and destroyers. The London Naval Treaty, a 1930 agreement between the same parties (except France), established total destroyer tonnage limits for the navies. The treaty also defined two categories: destroyer and destroyer leader; along with the maximum tonnage of each category, and the allowable ratio of one category to another.

In the London Naval Treaty, destroyers were established as "surface vessels of war the Standard Displacement (S.D.) of which does not exceed 1,850 tons and with a gun not above 5.1 inch caliber", as published in Ship’s Data for U.S. Naval Vessels. The “total completed tonnage not to be exceeded on December 31, 1936” was 150,000 S.D., but “not more than 16% of the allowed tonnage... shall be employed in vessels over 1,500 tons S.D.”. The new, higher limits rendered the existing flush-deckers obsolete, and the General Board soon moved to replace them. Since Japan was considered a probable adversary and was building destroyers through the 1920s, the General Board replaced the four-stackers with ships that could carry large quantities of fuel, ammunition, and supplies as needed to conduct operations across the vast Pacific Ocean.

For the next seven years, the United States Navy constructed "1500 tonners", or "goldplaters". The goldplaters earned this name because of the "over–lavish facilities", which drew comment from seasoned destroyermen. The armament of the Farragut and Mahan class destroyers initially included five 5 inch dual purpose guns, a number later reduced to four due to stability problems and a desire for a larger torpedo armament. With the introduction of the dual purpose main guns, destroyers acquired an anti-aircraft mission.

The  and es were similar in design to the Sims class, but had two stacks and a "split" or echeloned powerplant for extra endurance against torpedo attacks.

World War II 

On 7 December 1941, the day the United States entered World War II, the United States Navy had 100 destroyers seven years old or newer. This number included 27  and  destroyers. However, none were equipped with torpedoes comparable to the (then unknown) Type 93 torpedoes ("Long Lance torpedo") of the Imperial Japanese Navy, and only destroyer leaders had more than four main guns—inferior to the six guns on a Japanese  destroyer (the first 24 ships of the Benson/Gleaves class were built with five guns, but excessive topweight led to one being removed).

In 1940, fifty "flush deckers" were transferred to the British Royal Navy and the Royal Canadian Navy under the Destroyers for Bases Agreement. Other "flush deckers" were converted as high speed transports (APD), seaplane tenders (AVD), minelayers (DM), minesweepers (DMS), and other roles (AG), while some were retained as destroyers. Most remaining in US service were rearmed with varying numbers of 3 inch dual purpose guns.

After the 1500 ton limit on destroyers was changed to a 3000 ton limit with the Second London Naval Treaty, the United States Navy began sketches for a five-gun ship— on an enlarged hull. Introduced in 1942, the 175  "2100 tonners". became the U.S. Navy's signature destroyer in the Pacific War. By the end of World War II, the U.S. Navy had also commissioned 112 six-gun destroyers derived from the Fletcher design; 67  2200 tonners and 45  2250 tonners. The Allen M. Sumner class' hull was slightly wider than the Fletcher class', while the Gearing-class design was a lengthened version of the Allen M. Sumners. By 1945, as the threat from kamikazes increased and the threat from the Japanese surface fleet decreased, torpedoes and guns were partially (or completely in the case of torpedoes on some ships) removed from most US destroyers in favor of light anti-aircraft guns. Destroyers had acquired the hazardous radar picket mission by this time. Collectively, these destroyer designs are sometimes regarded as the most successful of World War II.

Cold War and beyond 

The first major warship the U.S. Navy constructed after World War II was an all-weather, anti-submarine hunter-killer, designated "destroyer leader" (DL), but referred to as a "frigate" (see List of United States Navy destroyer leaders). The majority of these carried long-range surface-to-air missiles (SAMs) to escort carrier and amphibious task forces, and were designated "guided missile destroyer leaders", some nuclear-powered (DLG or DLGN). In 1975, the twelve remaining - and  ships were reclassified as guided missile destroyers (DDGs 35-46), and the other classes were reclassified as guided missile cruisers (CG or CGN).

The following  added a short-range SAM launcher on an enlarged hull and were classified as DDGs.

The  was designed to serve as all-weather anti-submarine escorts for aircraft carrier task forces, as their anti-air missile complement was only sufficient for point defense. The Spruance-class destroyers were the first ships in the United States Navy powered with gas turbines—four marine turboshaft (jet-type) engines driving two shafts with reversible-pitch propellers. The 31 Spruance-class ships began service in September 1975 through the 1990s, when 24 members of the class were upgraded with vertical launching systems, and the last was decommissioned in 2005. The  was based on the Spruance class, but designed as more advanced multi-purpose ships with a significant SAM armament, intended for the Iranian Navy. In 1979, a revolution took place in Iran; the Shah was dethroned but instead of cancelling the four ships, they were acquired by the U.S. Navy, where they were nicknamed the "Ayatollah" or "dead Admiral" class.

At her commissioning, USS Arleigh Burke was extolled as the most powerful surface warship ever built. Arleigh Burke is one-third longer and correspondingly heavier than the Fletcher-class destroyers of the squadron Burke commanded in World War II; but about the same complement. The Arleigh Burke-class destroyers were based around the "Aegis" Combat System, like the larger s. The Arleigh Burke class was introduced in four "flights": Flight I, consisting of Arleigh Burke; Flight IA composed of 20 ships; Flight II, composed of 7 ships; and Flight IIA, composed of 34 ships. The Arleigh Burke class became the U.S. Navy's only active destroyer class when the last member of the Spruance class was decommissioned in 2005.

 destroyer production was limited to three ships due to burgeoning costs. Including research, the program costs reached $22.5 billion for the three ships. The first was commissioned in 2016 and the last is scheduled to be commissioned in 2019.

Production summary

A decade passes... during which some of the previously produced destroyers are even scrapped to comply with treaty limitations. In the early 1930s the Navy begins to modernize its destroyer fleet.  is the point in time where U.S. destroyers start carrying 5-inch main guns that can shoot at aircraft with a high rate of fire and good accuracy (in contrast to previous single purpose destroyer guns and much less capable contemporary dual purpose guns) as well as many other improvements. Destroyer design basically starts from scratch. Production during this period is a cold arms race where each nation tries to make the most of the limited tonnage the international treaties allow.

There are 3 production periods covered in the following table.

 6 Benson and 18 Gleaves in FY38, FY39, FY40 (8 per year)
 24 Benson and 48 Gleaves roughly in a vastly extended FY41 covering the regular FY41 approriations act of 11 June (8 ships) and the first and second supplemental appropriations acts of 26 June and 9 September (64 ships), in addition most of the Fletchers in the same 1940 acts
 the remaining Fletchers, all Sumners, Smiths and Gearings covered by later legislation, continuing the expansion of production initiated in 1940, carried out starting during 1941, slowing down by 1944 and lasting into 1946

The Consolidated Steel yard in Orange, the Seattle-Tacoma plant in Seattle and Bethlehem San Pedro were essentially purpose-built to produce destroyers between the fall of 1940 and the spring of 1941.

Gulf Shipbuilding was reactivated from essentially nothing, but had a primary focus of merchant ship production.

The other yards were significantly expanded during the same time period.

See also
List of United States Navy destroyers
List of United States Navy destroyer leaders
List of United States Navy ships

Notes

References

Boyne, Walter. Clash of Titans.  Simon and Schuster, NY,USA, 1995.  .
 Friedman, Norman, US Destroyers: An Illustrated Design History (Revised Edition), Naval Institute Press, Annapolis:2004, .
Lyon, David. The First Destroyers. Chatham Publishing 1 & 2 Faulkner's Alley, Cowcross St. London, Great Britain, 1996.  .
Simpson, Richard V. Building The Mosquito Fleet; The US Navy's First Torpedo Boats. Arcadia Publishing, Charleston SC, USA, 2001.  .

External links

 

Destroyers Classes
 Classes
United States Navy, classes
 United States Navy